Football Club Pune City was a professional association football club based in Pune, India, that plays in Indian Super League. The club was formed in 2014 and played its first competitive match on 14 October 2014 and hold on Delhi Dynamos FC by 0-0 tie. The club had never won any ISL title. The Club was dissolved due to financial constrains before the advent of 2019–20.

List of players
The list includes all the players registered under a FC Pune City contract. Some players might not have featured in a professional game for the club.

References

Lists of Indian Super League players
FC Pune City players
FC Pune City related lists
Lists of association football players by club in India
Association football player non-biographical articles